Reg Hindley (19 January 1914 – 12 October 1972) was a British equestrian. He competed in two events at the 1952 Summer Olympics.

References

1914 births
1972 deaths
British male equestrians
Olympic equestrians of Great Britain
Equestrians at the 1952 Summer Olympics
Sportspeople from Burnley